The Dansville and Mount Morris Railroad  is a short line railroad located in Dansville, New York.

The Dansville and Mount Morris Railroad first opened in the 1870s. It extended the entire length from Dansville to Mount Morris, New York.

The line operated independently until the July 23, 1985 purchase by Genesee & Wyoming Inc. It is now operated as part of the Rochester and Southern Railroad, but still exists as a non-operating subsidiary of Genesee and Wyoming.

Sources

External links

http://www.rochester-railfan.net/dmm.htm
 Genesee & Wyoming RR info

New York (state) railroads
Railway companies established in 1891
Genesee & Wyoming